Eurotunnel Le Shuttle (sometimes shortened to Le Shuttle or The Shuttle) is a railway shuttle service between Coquelles (near Calais) in Pas-de-Calais, France and Cheriton (near Folkestone) in Kent, United Kingdom. It conveys road vehicles (including bicycles and motorcycles) and passengers (including some animals) by rail through the Channel Tunnel. Freight vehicles are carried in separate shuttle trains hauled by the same locomotives, that also contain a passenger carriage, known as the Club Car.

The service is owned and operated by Getlink, the owner of the Channel Tunnel.

Operation

Both terminals are provided with vehicle check-in booths and juxtaposed controls (where pre-boarding immigration and customs checks are carried out by the French Border Police, French Customs and the UK Border Force), a large convenience outlet, long loading platforms and a loop of track. On arrival at the terminal, having booked beforehand or not, vehicles can check in (in separate freight/passenger booths) and go through the juxtaposed French and UK immigration and customs checks. If the vehicle is too early for its booked train, the passengers may visit the terminal building with cafés and duty free shopping, driving onto the train once it has arrived and is ready. The train is unloaded and loaded again in just over half an hour. Various safety announcements are played through the public address system, and the train departs once the loading wagons are stowed. After a train emerges from the tunnel, about 22 minutes later, it travels around the loop and stops at the terminal platform. It is then unloaded and reloaded with a new set of vehicles. Once at the other end, vehicles drive off of the train onto the French Autoroutes or British Motorways. The complete journey takes at least 1 hour and 30 minutes between the motorways, with the crossing being 35 minutes long.

The rail loop at Folkestone runs clockwise and is mostly in a cut-and-cover tunnel, whereas the loop at Coquelles goes anti-clockwise and out in the open. This evens the wear on the wheels of the shuttle locomotives and carriages, as each set (left or right) spends only half the time at the outer edge of the line traversing the curves. Because of the amount of land space available, the French loading platforms are specially designed so that they can be entered and exited in two directions, by both freight and passengers.

Carriages 

The carriages used for the shuttle have a larger loading gauge than either British or French railways. As a result, they cannot travel outside the tunnel and the two terminals onto the national railways.

Passenger vehicle shuttle trains 
The wagons on the front half are single deck and rear half are double deck. Each shuttle train also has a “single deck loader” at each end of the single deck section, and a “double deck loader” at each end of the double deck section. These loading wagons have doors that open for loading vehicles and close for travel through the tunnel and plates that allow vehicles to travel between the train carriage and the platform. Double deck loader wagons also have a ramp that allows vehicles to access the upper level. Ordinary cars and vehicles below  in height are typically loaded onto the double deck portion of the shuttle. Higher or longer vehicles, such as motorhomes, vehicles pulling a trailer and coaches, are loaded onto the single deck portion of the shuttle. Ordinary cars can also be placed in the unused portion of single deck wagons. Eurotunnel will occasionally run the double-deck carriages at "half full," closing the top deck to reduce staffing costs. When loading, vehicles drive between carriages, but the carriages are closed off individually when the train moves.

Once boarded, drivers and passengers can exit their vehicles to walk around or use the toilets, but there are currently no onboard services. Toilets are provided in every third carriage in the double-deck section and in the loading carriages in the single-deck section. Passengers are advised not to walk between the vehicles in areas that are not designated crossing areas, because the gradients in the tunnel ( of continuous slope at 1.1% on the English side) mean there is a dangerous possibility that vehicles could roll back and/or forward if the drivers forget to turn on the parking brake.

Freight vehicle shuttle trains 

Lorries (trucks) are carried on trains separate from passenger vehicles. Drivers load their own lorries onto the trains and, once they are in place and secured with wheel chocks, drivers are taken to the club car at the front of the train by bus. The club car offers free Wi-Fi, toilets and vending machines with drinks and snacks. At the end of the journey, drivers are taken back to their lorry by bus so they can drive off the train to continue their journey.

Control centres 
Rail and road traffic control centres are operated 24/7.

The overall management of the Channel Tunnel transport system is carried out from a railway control centre, the RCC. There are two control centres, one at each terminal, and each is capable of taking control of the system. The RCC manages all rail traffic (shuttles and trains) circulating on the Channel Tunnel infrastructure, including in the terminal areas.

The system consists of two parts, RTM (Rail Traffic Management) manages all rail traffic in the tunnels and in the terminal areas, and the EMS (Engineering Management System), which manages fixed equipment such as ventilation, lighting, feeding electricity to the catenary wires.

The Road Traffic Control Centres (TCC) are responsible for managing the movement of vehicles for Passenger and Freight services as they circulate around each terminal, presenting tolls, moving through border controls, boarding trains and exiting trains onto motorways (the A16 in France and M20 in the UK).

Safety 
Safety regulations require two locomotives for all shuttle trains through the tunnel, one at the front and one at the back, and both must be staffed so that the train can be reversed out in case of a blockage. On shuttle trains, two Class 9 locomotives handle a single shuttle train. Each locomotive is capable of hauling the train on its own in the event that its partner fails. In the event that both locomotives fail, another train with two fully functioning locomotives has sufficient power to move both its own load and the disabled train through the tunnel. Diesel locomotives are also on hand at both terminals in case they are needed to help a train out. There are also attendants in shuttle trains that manage the vehicles, loading and interior functions. On freight vehicle shuttles, the attendants ride in the passenger carriage at the front of the train with the truck drivers; in the passenger vehicle shuttles, they patrol the train. The trains are also long enough so that no matter where in the tunnel, the length of the train spans two evacuation doors into the service tunnel adjacent to the rail tunnels.

Passenger vehicle carriages are sealed off with fireproof doors and are pressurised. These doors are closed once all vehicles are loaded. They include smaller pedestrian doors that may be opened when the train is in motion to move from one carriage to the next but then close automatically.

Eurotunnel has been criticised for failing to implement measures to prevent or extinguish fires in the open-framed large-goods-vehicle-carrying wagons; recommendations made by the Fire Brigade Union in 1996 following a fire in the Channel Tunnel – that closed wagons should be used to prevent the spread of fire – were not acted upon.

Newer safety regulations have been tightened and relaxed. For one, trains are no longer required to have a locomotive at each end, just a driving cab at each end, as a rescue locomotive could assist a stricken train and the train does not need to split into sections. On the other hand, to stop the spread of fires, the formerly full lattice steel freight shuttle wagons now only cover the cab, and checks are carried out at each end of the tunnel to stop the risk of another fire happening in the future.

Incidents 
On 23 August 2022, an alarm went off in a shuttle to Folkestone, leading to a controlled stop and inspection about half way inside the Channel Tunnel. Dozens of people were left stranded in hours waiting for evacuation through the service tunnel before they could rejoin their vehicles.

References

External links 

Channel Tunnel
Car shuttle trains